House of Dipsheu (also referred to as Dipshow or Psheu) is a Circassian privateer house of Ubykhia of Circassia, who controlled the entirety of Psou River until the end of Russo-Circassian War. They were known for their privateer activities along the Black Sea coast of Circassia. They are found in Adygea and Krasnodar Krai within Russian Federation; as well as in Republic of Turkey due to Circassian Genocide in the present day.

Etymology

Notable members

Circassia

Russian Empire

Ottoman Empire

Soviet Union

Modern Age

References

Circassian houses